The 1889 Cornell Big Red football team was an American football team that represented Cornell University during the 1889 college football season.  The team compiled an 8–4 record and outscored all opponents by a combined total of 354 to 130.

Schedule

References

Cornell
Cornell Big Red football seasons
Cornell Big Red football